Sydney James Slocomb (21 May 1930 – 28 February 2021) was an Australian rules footballer who played with St Kilda in the Victorian Football League (VFL).

Notes

External links 

1930 births
Australian rules footballers from Victoria (Australia)
St Kilda Football Club players
2021 deaths